James Fraser McLuskey, MC (19 September 1914 – 24 July 2005) was a British Church of Scotland minister, who served as a military chaplain with the Special Air Service during World War II. He later went on to become the minister of St Columba's, the larger of the Church of Scotland's two congregations in London. He also served as Moderator of the General Assembly from 1983 to 1984.

Early life
McLuskey was born in Edinburgh on 19 September 1914 but his family moved to Aberdeen where his father ran a laundry business. He attended Aberdeen Grammar School from 1920 to 1931 and returned to Edinburgh to take degrees in arts and divinity. Fraser McLuskey, as he was known, spent several months on a travel scholarship where he became interested in the Confessional Church in Germany, which was made up of those opposed to Adolf Hitler and to Nazi attempts to exercise control over the Protestant churches. Here he met his future wife, Irene Calaminus, the daughter of a pastor in the Confessional Church.

World War II
In 1939 McLuskey succeeded Dr Archie Craig as chaplain to the University of Glasgow. In 1942 he took leave of absence to become an Army chaplain, and after parachute training he was posted to the Special Air Service, with whom he served in France, Germany and Norway. He was awarded the Military Cross.

Aftermath
After returning to Britain Fraser McLuskey travelled throughout the country visiting the families of men killed in action with the SAS to explain the circumstances of their death. From 1947 to 1950, Fraser was sub-warden at the Royal Army Chaplains' Training Centre. He then returned to Scotland, first to the parish of Broughty Ferry East and then, in 1955 to New Kilpatrick on the outskirts of Glasgow, which had a congregation of more than 2,000, one of the largest in the Church of Scotland. It was while Fraser McLuskey was there that his wife Irene died of breast cancer, leaving McLuskey to look after their two teenage sons.

Later life
Shortly afterwards, he moved to St Columba's Church, London. He was a strong believer in having Church of Scotland outposts in London. Mcluskey united St Columba's with another outpost of the kirk in Dulwich, and also linked with the congregation of St Andrew's, Newcastle upon Tyne. He retired in 1986 to Edinburgh, where he became a member of a group of current and retired ministers who supported the Conservative Party and opposed the left-wing stance of the Church of Scotland during the time of Margaret Thatcher. He spent much of his free time travelling the countryside where he went with the Special Air Service in World War II.

Controversy
In 1966 McLuskey was landed in controversy when he planned to marry a widow, Ruth Briant, who before her marriage to Colonel Keith Briant, had been divorced. Believing that his marriage to a divorcee meant the end of his ministry, he decided to resign his charge. However he was persuaded by many to withdraw his letter of resignation and remained married to Ruth Briant till the end of his life.

Death
Fraser McLuskey died in Edinburgh on 24 July 2005.

See also
List of Moderators of the General Assembly of the Church of Scotland

References

1914 births
2005 deaths
Clergy from Edinburgh
Royal Army Chaplains' Department officers
Special Air Service officers
Moderators of the General Assembly of the Church of Scotland
British Army personnel of World War II
Recipients of the Military Cross
People associated with the University of Glasgow
Scottish military chaplains
World War II chaplains
People educated at Aberdeen Grammar School
20th-century Ministers of the Church of Scotland